Philochortus hardeggeri, Hardegger's orangetail lizard or  Hardegger's shield-backed lizard, is a species of lizard found in Somalia, Djibouti, and Ethiopia.

References

Philochortus
Reptiles described in 1891
Taxa named by Franz Steindachner